Linarite is a somewhat rare, crystalline mineral that is known among mineral collectors for its unusually intense, pure blue color. It is formed by the oxidation of galena and chalcopyrite and other copper sulfides. It is a combined copper lead sulfate hydroxide with formula  PbCuSO4(OH)2. 
Linarite occurs as monoclinic prismatic to tabular crystals and irregular masses. It is easily confused with azurite, but does not react with dilute hydrochloric acid as azurite does. It has a Mohs hardness of 2.5 and a specific gravity of 5.3 - 5.5.

Linarite was first identified in 1822. It is named after the Linares Plateau, Spain. It occurs in association with brochantite, anglesite, caledonite, leadhillite, cerussite, malachite and hemimorphite.

Image gallery

References

Mineral galleries

Lead minerals
Copper(II) minerals
Sulfate minerals
Monoclinic minerals
Minerals in space group 11